White Eagle is a 1932 American pre-Code Western movie directed by Lambert Hillyer. The film stars Buck Jones, Barbara Weeks, and Robert Ellis. Columbia Pictures later adapted this film into a 1941 serial of the same title, also starring Buck Jones.

See White Eagle (1941 serial).

Cast
 Buck Jones as White Eagle
 Barbara Weeks as Janet Rand
 Robert Ellis as Gregory
 Ward Bond as Bart
 Robert Elliott as Captain Blake
 Bob Kortman as Sheriff
 Frank Campeau as Gray Wolf
 Jimmy Howe as Zachariah Kershaw
 Jim Thorpe as Indian Chief
 Clarence Geldert as Doctor
 Silver as White Eagle's horse

References

External links
 

1932 films
American black-and-white films
1932 Western (genre) films
Films directed by Lambert Hillyer